The McLaren MP4-29 was a Formula One racing car designed and built by McLaren to compete in the 2014 Formula One season. The chassis was designed by Tim Goss, Neil Oatley, Matt Morris, Mark Ingham and Marcin Budkowski and was powered by a customer Mercedes-Benz powertrain.  The car was unveiled on 24 January 2014, and was driven by  World Drivers' Champion Jenson Button and debutant Kevin Magnussen, who replaced Sergio Pérez, after he won the 2013 Formula Renault 3.5 Series title.

Background 
The MP4-29 was designed to use Mercedes' new 1.6-litre V6 turbocharged engine, the PU106A Hybrid.

This was the last McLaren model that was powered by a Mercedes-Benz engine until the 2021 season, due to the team switching to Honda in 2015. It was also the last Mercedes-powered F1 car to use ExxonMobil fuel to foster Mercedes' partnership with Petronas.

It is the first Formula One car to use the Esso brand since 2009, which applied in some places for the 2014 season and applied fully from 2015 along with Exxon and Mobil in selected locations before switched to Red Bull Racing in 2017.

Season
This was McLaren's last podium until the 2019 Brazilian Grand Prix. The cars sported a Mobil 1 livery to honour the team's 20-year association with the brand.

The promising result from Australia was followed by disappointing performances, including both cars unable to complete the  due to technical reasons. The team failed to record another podium finish all season, and although statistically, the MP4-29 was the most mechanically reliable car of the season with 36 classified finishes out of a possible 38, they ultimately finished fifth in the Constructors' Championship.

Aftermath

McLaren MP4-29H/1X1
The car suffered problems throughout, completing a total of six untimed laps over the two-day test.

Complete Formula One results
(key)

'''Notes:
† — Driver failed to finish the race, but was classified as they had completed greater than 90% of the race distance.

References

McLaren Formula One cars
2014 Formula One season cars